Kepodactylus is an extinct genus of ctenochasmatid pterodactyloid pterosaur from the Kimmeridgian-Tithonian-age Upper Jurassic Morrison Formation of Colorado, United States.

In 1992, a team from the Denver Museum of Natural History dug up a specimen of the dinosaur Stegosaurus stenops in Garden Park, Colorado. In the quarry they also found smaller disarticulated bones from other animals, among which were those of a pterosaur new to science.

In 1996, Jerald Harris and Kenneth Carpenter named the new genus. The type species is Kepodactylus insperatus. The genus name is derived from Greek, kepos, "garden", a reference to Garden Park and daktylos, "finger", referring to the typical wing finger of pterosaurs. The specific name means "unhoped-for" in Latin, alluding to the fact that the researchers hoped to find a dinosaur, and did not expect a pterosaur.

The genus is based on the holotype DMNH 21684, consisting of a cervical vertebra, humerus, several finger bones, and a metatarsal.  Kepodactylus was similar to Mesadactylus but larger (wingspan around 2.5 m [8.2 ft]), and with additional pneumatic foramina (holes to allow air from air sacks to enter the bones) in the vertebrae and humerus. The describers concluded that the species was a member of the Pterodactyloidea and within this group, using the phylogeny of David Unwin, a member of a clade that is now known as Lophocratia. It was regarded as a potentially valid genus in the most recent review of Morrison pterosaurs.

Classification
The cladogram below shows a phylogenetic analysis published by Longrich, Martill, and Andres in 2018. They recovered Kepodactylus as a basal member of the family Ctenochasmatidae.

See also
 List of pterosaur genera
 Timeline of pterosaur research

References

Ctenochasmatoids
Late Jurassic pterosaurs of North America
Morrison fauna
Taxa named by Kenneth Carpenter
Fossil taxa described in 1996